Hippopsis pallida is a species of beetle in the family Cerambycidae. It was described by Carvalho in 1981.

References

Hippopsis
Beetles described in 1981